McArthur Peak is a peak in the Saint Elias Mountains of Yukon, Canada. The peak, 13th highest in Canada, sits 11 km NE of Mount Logan, the highest mountain in Canada. A secondary peak two kilometres to the east is known as McArthur East. The peak was named for James Joseph McArthur, a Dominion Land Surveyor who also made the first ascent of a Canadian peak over 10,000 ft (3047 m) — Mount Stephen in 1887.

The first ascent was made in 1961 from the Hubbard Glacier up the north ridge by Barbara Lilley, Alexander McDermott, Donald Monk, Seymour Ossofsky, George Wallerstein.


See also

List of mountain peaks of North America
List of mountain peaks of Canada

References

 McArthur Peak on the Canadian Mountain Encyclopedia

External links

Four-thousanders of Yukon
Saint Elias Mountains